"Requiem pour un fou" is a song by French singer Johnny Hallyday. It was released in 1976.

Commercial performance 
The song spent four consecutive weeks at no. 1 on the singles sales chart in France (from 4 to 31 March 1976).

Charts

References 

1976 songs
1976 singles
Johnny Hallyday songs
French songs
Songs about death
Mercury Records singles
Number-one singles in France
Song articles with missing songwriters